Eduard Kunz (March 3, 1929 – November 18, 2020) was a former Swiss slalom canoeist who competed in the 1940s and the 1950s. He won two medals in the folding K-1 team event at the ICF Canoe Slalom World Championships with a gold in 1949 and a bronze in 1951.

References

Swiss male canoeists
1929 births
2020 deaths
Medalists at the ICF Canoe Slalom World Championships